Christopher Bowie Therien (born December 14, 1971), affectionately known as Bundy, is a Canadian former professional ice hockey defenceman who played 12 National Hockey League (NHL) seasons for the Philadelphia Flyers and Dallas Stars. He was the lead analyst for Flyers Pregame Live and Flyers Postgame Live on NBC Sports Philadelphia. Prior to the 2018-19 NHL season he was a color commentator inside the glass for the Flyers on NBC Sports Philadelphia. He was also previously the Flyers' radio color commentator on 97.5 The Fanatic. He is currently the lead commentator for Ice Wars International.

Playing career
After registering 35 goals and 37 assists in 31 games for Northwood School in 1989–90, Chris Therien was drafted by the Philadelphia Flyers in the 3rd round, 47th overall of the 1990 NHL Entry Draft. He attended Providence College for three years and joined the Canadian national team after graduating. He was a member of the Canadian team which won silver at the 1994 Lillehammer Olympics. He started his professional career in 1994 playing for the Hershey Bears of the AHL. Once the NHL Lockout came to an end, he joined the Flyers and played every regular season and playoff game in the abbreviated season, earning a spot on the NHL All-Rookie Team. He enjoyed his best season in 1996–97 by recording a career high in points (24) and plus/minus (+27) in 71 games while helping lead the Flyers to the Stanley Cup Finals. After playing nine and a half seasons with the Flyers, he was traded to the Dallas Stars on March 8, 2004, for a 2004 8th round draft pick and a 2005 3rd round draft pick. He signed a one-year contract to return to the Flyers shortly after the 2004–05 NHL lockout came to an end, and ended up playing in 47 games before having his season cut short due to a head injury.

Known primarily as a defensive defenceman, Therien was usually partnered with Éric Desjardins over the years. He was also well known for elevating his game when matched up against star forward Jaromír Jágr. His teammates took to calling him Bundy after the character Al Bundy from Married... with Children.

Therien is unfortunately remembered for taking the slapshot that ended the career of Trent McCleary in a game, which McCleary attempted to block. The shot ended up striking McCleary in the throat, which had enough force to damage his larynx. He was critically injured when hit in the throat by the shot which fractured his larynx and resulted in a collapsed lung.

Therien and his family have been residents of the Marlton section of Evesham Township, New Jersey. Daughters Isabella Therien, Ava Therien, and Alexa Therien are well known all-stars at Cherokee Highschool  in the spot light for basketball. They all play Division 1 Basketball at Loyola University in Maryland. All three have excelled as athletes just like their father. They have been featured on ESPN for  basketball honors and also on the TV show Tomboy.

Awards and honors

 1993–94: Silver Medal (XVII Olympic Winter Games)
 1994–95: All-Rookie Team (NHL)

Records
 His 753 games played as a Philadelphia Flyer is first among defenseman in Flyers history.

Career statistics

Regular season and playoffs

International

References

External links
 
 Philadelphia Flyers Hockey Legend Wins in Overtime, Behavioral Corner Podcast

1971 births
Living people
Canadian ice hockey defencemen
Dallas Stars players
Hershey Bears players
Ice hockey people from Ottawa
Ice hockey players at the 1994 Winter Olympics
Medalists at the 1994 Winter Olympics
Olympic ice hockey players of Canada
Olympic medalists in ice hockey
Olympic silver medalists for Canada
People from Evesham Township, New Jersey
Philadelphia Flyers announcers
Philadelphia Flyers draft picks
Philadelphia Flyers players
Philadelphia Phantoms players
Providence Friars men's ice hockey players
Children:Isabella Therien, Ava Therien, Alexa Therien, Christopher Therien JR